This is a complete list of members of the United States Senate during the 110th United States Congress listed by seniority, from January 3, 2007, to January 3, 2009. It is meant as a historical listing and thus contains senators who have died or left office (such as Senator Thomas and Senator Lott). For a current listing of senators please go to Seniority in the United States Senate.

In this congress, Jeff Bingaman (D-New Mexico) was the most senior junior senator and Norm Coleman (R-Minnesota) was the most junior senior senator.

Order of service is based on the commencement of the senator's first term. Behind this is former service as a U.S. senator (only giving the senator seniority within his or her new incoming class), service as U.S. Vice President, a House member, a cabinet secretary, a state governor, and then by their state's population, respectively.

Senators who were sworn in   the middle of the two-year congressional term (up until the last senator who was not sworn in early after winning the November 2008 election) are listed at the end of the list with no number.

Terms of service

U.S. Senate seniority list

See also
110th United States Congress
List of members of the United States House of Representatives in the 110th Congress by seniority

Notes

External links

110
Senate Seniority